The Guanyin of Nanshan is a  statue of the bodhisattva Guanyin, sited on the south coast of China's island province Hainan near the Nanshan Temple of Sanya. The statue has three aspects: one side faces inland and the other two face the South China Sea, to represent blessing and protection by Guanyin of China and the whole world. One aspect depicts Guanyin cradling a sutra in the left hand and gesturing the Vitaraka Mudra with the right; the second with her palms crossed, holding a string of prayer beads; and the third holding a lotus. , this was the 14th tallest statue in the world.

The statue took six years to build and was enshrined on April 24, 2005, with the participation of 108 monks from various Buddhist groups in Taiwan, Hong Kong, Macao and Mainland China, and tens of thousands of pilgrims. The delegation also included monks from the Theravada and Vajrayana traditions.

See also

 Guanyin of Mount Xiqiao, Guangdong, China
 Guishan Guanyin, Hunan, China
 List of tallest statues
 Nanshan Temple (Sanya)
 Sendai Daikannon, Japan

References

External links
 Top 10 highest monuments - Architecture Portal News  (4 photos)
 Photos at Panoramio

Outdoor sculptures in China
Colossal Guanyin statues
2005 sculptures
Tourist attractions in Sanya
Buildings and structures in Hainan
2005 establishments in China
Buildings and structures completed in 2005